Calcium guanylate is a compound with formula Ca(C10H12O4N5PO4). It is the calcium salt of guanylic acid. It is present in all living cells as part of RNA, and is commercially prepared from yeast extract or fish.

As a food additive, it is used as a flavor enhancer, particularly low-salt products and has the E number E629.

References 

Nucleotides
Calcium compounds
E-number additives